An electrostatic fieldmeter, also called a static meter is a tool used in the static control industry. It is used for non-contact measurement of electrostatic charge on an object. It measures the force between the induced charges in a sensor and the charge present on the surface of an object. This force is converted to volts, measuring both the initial peak voltage and the rate at which it falls away.

Operation:
a charge monitoring probe is placed close (1 mm to 5 mm) to the surface to be measured and the probe body is driven to the same potential as the measured unknown by an electronic circuit. This achieves a high accuracy measurement that is virtually insensitive to variations in probe-to-surface distances. The technique also prevents arc-over between the probe and measured surface when measuring high voltages.

Alternative method:
The operation of the an electrostatic field meter is based on the charge-discharge process of an electrically floating electrode: Corona source charges a floating electrode, which discharges with a regular repetition frequency to the earth-electrode. The discharge repetition frequency is the measured variable which is a function of the background electrostatic field. 
Beside static charge control in electrostatic discharge (ESD) sensitive environments, another possible application is the measurement of the atmospheric electric field, if sufficient sensitivity is available.

See also
Coulombmeter
Electrometer
Electroscope
Electrostatic voltmeter
Faraday cup

References

Further reading
 – Electrostatic field meter - Texaco, Inc., 1987 (filed 1983)
 – Non-contact autoranging electrostatic fieldmeter with automatic distance indicator, Simco-Ion, Hatfield, PA, 1987 (filed 1985)

Electrical meters
Electrical test equipment
Electronic test equipment
Electronics work tools
Electrostatics
Measuring instruments